Nanur (also Romanized as Nanūr; also known as Nanor and Pahlavī Dezh) is a village in Nanur Rural District, Nanur District, Baneh County, Kurdistan Province, Iran. At the 2006 census, its population was 530, in 88 families. The village is populated by Kurds.

References 

Towns and villages in Baneh County
Kurdish settlements in Kurdistan Province